Bannerman Plantation was a forced-labor farm of about  and located in northwest Leon County, Florida, just north of the old unincorporated community of Meridian and west-northwest of Lake Iamonia. Bannerman Plantation was established in 1852 or earlier by Charles Bannerman of North Carolina, who by 1860 had enslaved 67 people to work his land.

The plantation house is located at 13426 N. Meridian Rd. and is a 2-story home with porches on both floors that partially wrap to each side of the house. The porches are supported with eight stately columns. Fireplaces are located at both left and right sides of the home. A kitchen extends off the left side of the home. The boundaries of Bannerman Plantation itself are unknown.

The Leon County Florida 1860 Agricultural Census shows that Bannerman Plantation had the following:
 Improved Land: 
 Unimproved Land: 
 Cash value of plantation: $14,475
 Cash value of farm implements/machinery: $700
 Cash value of farm animals: $5000
 Number of slaves: 67
 Bushels of corn: 4,000
 Bales of cotton: 120

Notes

References

External links
National Register
Florida Heritage

National Register of Historic Places in Leon County, Florida
Federal architecture in Florida
Plantations in Leon County, Florida
Cotton plantations in Florida